Micol is a given name.  Notable people with the given name include: 

 Micol Cattaneo (born 1982), Italian athlete 
 Micol Cristini (born 1997), Italian figure skater
 Micol Di Segni (born 1973), Italian professional Mixed martial artist and Alternative model
 Micol Fontana (1913 - 2015), Italian stylist and entrepreneur
 Micol Hebron (born 1972), American interdisciplinary artist, curator, and associate professor at Chapman University,
 Micol Ostow (born 1976), American author, editor and educator

See also 

 Micol (disambiguation)

Given names